The 2016–2017 South Korean protests or the Candlelight Demonstrations, also known as the Candlelight Vigil, were a series of protests against President Park Geun-hye that occurred throughout South Korea from November 2016 to March 2017. Protesters denounced the Park administration's 2016 political scandal and called for the resignation of Park Geun-hye.

After the impeachment of Park Geun-hye on corruption charges in December, the pro-Park rallies mobilized thousands of protesters for counter demonstrations. In February 2017, the Liberty Korea Party, at the time the ruling party of South Korea, claimed that the size of pro-Park rallies had surpassed the size of anti-Park rallies.

Background 

In October 2016, a political scandal erupted over President Park Geun-hye's undisclosed links to Choi Soon-sil, a woman with no security clearance and no official position, who was found to have been giving secret counsel to the president.

Choi had known Park since the 1970s, as Choi's father, Choi Tae-min, was a mentor for Park Chung-hee, then-president and Park Geun-hye's father. At the time, the Park family was still grieving from the assassination of the first-lady Yuk Young-soo, and Choi Tae-min claimed that he could channel communication with her.

Both had remained friends since, even after Park Geun-hye became president. Park's behavior during her tenure had raised suspicions, due to her lack of communication with parts of the government and the press.

Choi, who had no official government position, was revealed to have access to confidential documents and information from the president, and acted as a close confidant for the president. Choi and Park's senior staff used their influence to extort ₩77.4 billion (~$774 million) from Korean chaebols – family-owned large business conglomerates – setting up two media and sports-related foundations, the Mir and K-sports foundations. Choi embezzled money during the process, and it is reported that some of the funds were used to support her daughter Chung Yoo-ra's dressage activities in Germany. She is also accused of rigging the admissions process at Ewha Womans University to help her daughter get accepted at the university. Ahn Jong-bum, a top presidential aide, was arrested for abusing power and helping Choi; he denied wrongdoing and claims he simply followed presidential orders.

On October 25, 2016, Park  publicly acknowledged her close ties with Choi. On October 28, Park dismissed key members of her top office staff and Park's opinion rating dropped to 5%, the lowest ever for a sitting South Korean president. Her approval rating ranged from 1 to 3% for Korean citizens under 60 years of age, while it remained higher at 13% for the over 60 years age group.

This also prompted President Park to fire members of her cabinet and the prime minister of South Korea in order to redirect the public's criticism. In particular, the sacking of the prime minister Hwang Kyo-ahn resulted in a controversy, due to the claim that his firing had been done via text message.

Protests against Park Geun-hye

2016 

On October 29, the first candlelight protest was held with about 20,000 participants (estimates range from 10,000 to 30,000). The numbers grew rapidly in the following weeks.

November 

On 1 November, a man used an excavator to crash into the front entrance of the Supreme Prosecutors' Office building during a protest in Seoul.

On 5 November, people attended rally early on Saturday evening petition for Park's resignation. The police estimated 43,000, but organizers claimed more than 100,000.

On 12 November, four officers were injured during the demonstrations. Twenty-six protesters were taken to hospital with injuries and a further 29 were treated at the scene of the protests.

On 19 November, a large number of South Korean high school students also joined the crowds after taking the college entrance test. A short drive away from the protest, a group of conservative counter protesters gathered outside Seoul station in defense of the president until 17 December.

On 28 November, 1.9 million people hit the streets in a nationwide anti-president rally

December 

On 3 December 2.3 million people hit the streets in a further anti-Park rally, one of the largest in the country's history. An estimated 1.6 million people gathered around the main boulevards from the City Hall to Gwanghwamun Square and Gyeongbok Palace. Another estimated 200,000 people gathered around the city of Busan and 100,000 in Gwangju.

On 10 December, following the National Assembly's vote to impeach Park, hundreds of thousands gathered for weekly protests celebrating the move.

But, on 17 December, pro-Park supporters held their first major demonstrations in Seoul, with organizers claiming an attendance of one million. They called for the reinstatement of the currently impeached president.

On 24 December, 550,000 people held the Christmas Santa Rally, calling for the Park's immediate removal.

On 31 December, South Koreans celebrate New Year's Eve with mass protest. Over 1 million people take to the street according to Organizer, brought the cumulative number of people who have attended the protests since October to 10 millions, the largest weekly protest in South Korean history.

2017

January 

On January 7, hundreds of thousands of protestors returned to the streets of Seoul demanding impeached President's immediate removal and the salvaging of a sunken ferry which left more than 300 dead. At 7 pm (10:00 GMT) hundreds of yellow balloons were released and the protestors blew out the candles they were carrying as a symbolic gesture asking that Park clarify the mystery surrounding her seven-hour absence at the time of the ferry sinking.

On 21 January, South Koreans took to the streets Saturday to demand the arrest of the Samsung scion whose arrest warrant was rejected by a court last week, in the 13th candlelit protest calling for President Park Geun-hye to resign. Braving snow and cold, hundreds of thousands of protesters also demanded the Constitutional Court expedite review of Park's impeachment.

February 
As the Candlelight rallies reached 100th day, on 4 February, 400,000 people gathered at Gwanghwamun Plaza in Seoul, calling for an extension of the Special Prosecutor’s investigation and for Park to step down immediately.

On 11 February, hundreds of thousands of Koreans took to the streets where both pro- and anti-impeachment groups held their respective rallies. Those who opposed Park held their 15th weekly candlelight rally in Gwanghwamun Square, while her supporters waved South Korean flags outside of Seoul City Hall for their 12th rally. Presidential hopefuls including provincial governor An Hee-jung and former leader of the main opposition Democratic Party Moon Jae-in attended the anti-Park rally. Rhee In-je of the ruling Saenuri Party attended the pro-Park rally "to be part of the patriotic people's wave," while Ahn Cheol-soo, a former chair of the minor opposition People's Party, did not attend either rally.

After Samsung vice-chairman Lee Jae-Yong was arrested at 17 February by Special Prosecutors on charges of bribery in connection with the scandal, 700,000 people walked to the street on 18 February. Protesters urged the Constitutional Court, currently reviewing the legitimacy of the impeachment, to promptly reach a conclusion for the ouster of the president..

On 25 February, Hundreds of thousands of Koreans held rival demonstrations in Seoul over the impeachment of President Park Geun-hye on the fourth anniversary of her swearing into office. Anti-Park protest organizers claimed a one million turnout and pro-Park supporters said they had attracted three million. The demonstrations come as court prepares to hold final hearing on president's impeachment over corruption scandal.

March 
After Constitutional court removed Park Geun-hye from power over a corruption scandal, ousted South Korean President Park Geun-hye maintained her silence on Saturday as her opponents and supporters divided the capital's streets with massive rallies that showed a nation deeply split over its future. Carrying flags and candles and cheering jubilantly, tens of thousands of people occupied a boulevard in downtown Seoul to celebrate Park's ouster. Meanwhile, in a nearby grass square, a large crowd of Park's supporters glumly waved national flags near a stage where organizers, wearing red caps and military uniforms, vowed to resist what they are calling "political assassination."

Nearly 20,000 police officers were deployed on Saturday to monitor the protesters, who were also separated by tight perimeters created by hundreds of police buses. They also held Rival rallies on 1 and 4 March respectively.

Impeachment of Park Geun-hye 

On 3 December 2016, three opposition parties agreed to introduce a joint impeachment motion against President Park Geun-hye. The motion, which was signed by 171 of 300 lawmakers, was put to a vote on Friday, 9 December 2016, and passed with 234 out of 300 votes, a tally much greater than the required 2/3 majority and which included 62 members of Park's Saenuri Party. The Impeachment process then moved to the Constitutional Court of Korea which could take 180 days to review the impeachment.

Park Geun-hye was finally impeached on 10 March 2017.

Protests to rally for Park Geun-hye

2016
On October 31, 2016, a group of conservative protesters had a protest at the front of the South Korean media JTBC headquarters, claiming its coverage about the scandal as biased and unfounded.

On November 19, 2016, thousands of Park's supporters staged their protests in central Seoul, calling on the president not to succumb to mounting pressure on her to step aside.

On December 17, 2016, the pro-Park protesters blamed the media for fueling anti-Park sentiment, focusing their coverage too much on the views of younger and liberal voters and on criticism that Park received cosmetic procedures while in office.

2017
Pro-president rallies have grown substantially. On January 14, 2017, the organizers of the protests claim that 1.2 million people gathered in central Seoul, insisting that the Constitutional Court should reject the impeachment.

While the anti-Park protests once attracted more than a million but shrank after Park's impeachment, the number of pro-Park protesters reached 2.1 million and began to overwhelm their rivals, according to the organizer's claims. Claims from the organizers has been criticized for almost unrealistic exaggeration of the number of participants.

Number of protesters

Casualties
On 11 March 2017, police say 3 people were killed and dozens were injured in clashes between police and Park's supporters after the Constitutional Court of Korea ruled the impeachment valid.

Controversy 
At around 5 p.m. on March 4, 2017, MBC reporters covering a rally in favor of impeachment at Gwanghwamun Square in Seoul were assaulted with their fists by two men who participated in the rally.

Plans for a military crackdown on protests
In July 2018, it emerged that the Defense Security Command made plans for declaring martial law and authority to use military force to crack down on protesters, if the Constitutional Court did not uphold Park's removal from office.
The DSC had planned to mobilize 200 tanks, 550 armoured vehicles, 4,800 armed personnel and 1,400 members of special forces in Seoul in order to enforce martial law. Other components of the plan included monitoring and censoring media content and arresting politicians taking part in protests.

See also
Protests against Donald Trump
People Power Revolution
2015–2016 protests in Brazil

References

Protests
2016 protests
History of South Korea
Protests
Protests
Korea, South
Korean Protests
Korean Protests
Korean, South Protests
Korean, South Protests
Civil disobedience
Park Geun-hye Government
Protests in South Korea